The United Presbyterian Church of North America (UPCNA) was an American Presbyterian denomination that existed for one hundred years. It was formed on May 26, 1858 by the union of the Northern branch of the Associate Reformed Presbyterian Church (Covenanter and Seceder) with the Associate Presbyterian Church (Seceders) at a convention at the Old City Hall in Pittsburgh. On May 28, 1958, it merged with the Presbyterian Church in the United States of America (PCUSA) at a conference in Pittsburgh to form the United Presbyterian Church in the United States of America (UPCUSA).

It began as a mostly ethnic Scottish denomination, but after some years it grew somewhat more and more ethnically diverse, although universally English-speaking, and was geographically centered in Western Pennsylvania and eastern Ohio, areas of heavy Scottish and Scotch-Irish settlement on the American frontier. Within that territory, a large part of its adherents lived in rural areas, which amplified the denomination's already highly traditionalist worldview.

Seceders
The founders of the Associate Presbyterian Church of North America, nicknamed the "Seceders", were direct immigrants from Scotland, and reflected the numerous quarrels and divisions which rent Scottish Presbyterianism. Even after the Scot Seceders had made their peace with other elements in the mother country, American Seceders retained their separate identity until 1858, when most of them united with much of the Associate Reformed Presbyterian Church to form the United Presbyterian Church of North America.

Associate Reformed Church
Historian William L. Fisk traces the history of the Associate Reformed Church in the Old Northwest from its formation by a union of Associate and Reformed Presbyterians in 1782 to the merger of this body with other groups to form the United Presbyterian Church in 1858. It became the Associate Reformed Synod of the West and remain centered in the Midwest. It withdrew from the parent body in 1820 because of the drift of the Eastern churches toward assimilation into the larger Presbyterian Church. The Associate Reformed Synod of the West maintained the characteristics of an immigrant church with Scotch-Irish roots, emphasized the Westminster standards, used only the psalms in public worship, was Sabbatarian, and was strongly abolitionist and anti-Catholic. In the 1850s it exhibited many evidences of assimilation. It showed greater ecumenical interest, greater interest in evangelization of the West and of the cities, and a declining interest in maintaining the unique characteristics of its immigrant past.

Beliefs and practices
Its theology was a conservative Calvinism and also held the distinctives of the Covenanters and Seceders, such as public covenanting, adherence to the Solemn League and Covenant, and exclusive use of the Psalms in singing. (These are very similar to a sister body that still exists, the Reformed Presbyterian Church of North America.) The church moderated some of its stances in the twentieth century, such as when it released its Confessional Statement and Testimony (1925), abandoning compulsion of such practices as exclusive psalmody.

Merger
Around this time, the UPCNA sought mergers with various other Reformed churches and finally agreed to merge with the much larger PCUSA in 1958, the year of its centennial, to form the UPCUSA. Most UPCNA-heritage congregations entered into the present Presbyterian Church (USA) (which succeeded the UPCUSA in 1983), but some of more evangelical conservative orientation departed in the 1970s to denominations such as the Presbyterian Church in America (founded 1973) and the Evangelical Presbyterian Church (1981).

Missions

Egypt
American missionaries first came to Egypt in 1854; British Protestant missions already existed but the Associate Reformed missionaries had 600 converts in a network of stations by 1875, and 4600 members by 1895, seeking to convert Copts, with occasional outreach to Muslims as well.  local government officials were hostile but by 1917, the "American Mission" was the largest Protestant group in Egypt, and had spent over £E800,000 on its missionary efforts. The American Mission was the largest Protestant operation in Egypt. It trained local clerics, built schools by 1894 reached the status of a synod with four presbyteries. By 1926 it became the "Evangelical Church in Egypt," and while still part of the UPC it was self-governing, and operated its own seminary.  However, with the "Anti-Missionary Campaign" of the 1930s, the Americans were forced to rethink their strategy.   There were tensions between Egyptian ministers and American missionaries, particularly over the idea of converting Muslims and the adoption of "modern" Western attitudes. The independent, postcolonial church grew out of the political and social environment of Egypt.  The synod became the Coptic Evangelical Church, and was wholly controlled by Egyptians in 1957.

Separately the American Mission also created the American University in Cairo in 1919, which quickly became a center for Americanization and modernization in the Arab world.  However, due to Religious Controversies and the waning interest in evangelicalism by the university's founder Charles A. Watson, the relationship slowly deteriorated and now the university is no longer connected to the UPCNA.

Colonial India
From the beginning, the goal of the Sialkot Mission of the UPCNA, established in 1854, was the encouragement and nurturing of leadership for the Synod of the Punjab in colonial India, which was later partitioned in 1947 between independent India and the newly created state of Pakistan.

In the Punjab Province of undivided India, United Presbyterian churches were established in the cities of Rawalpindi (1856), Gujranwala (1863), Gurdaspur (1872), Jhelum (1874), Zafarwal (1880), Pathankot (1882), Pasrur (1884), Dhariwal (1890), Lyallpur (1895), Sangla Hill (1901), Sargodha (1905), Lahore (1913), and Badomali (1915), Campbellpur (1916), Martinpur (1918), Taxila (1921), Sheikhupura (1923). Christian missionaries established hospitals, schools, technical training centers, and colleges as well.

These leaders have ranged from illiterate village elders to pastors of important city congregations, as well as a bishop in the Church of Pakistan. They have included Christian craftsmen and artisans, teachers and professors, doctors and nurses - all of whom have given themselves to building up a strong Christian Church in the Punjab. After the partition of India, mission schools have been nationalized by the Muslim Pakistani government; the problem of training future leadership faces a hazardous and difficult future.

See also
 List of Moderators of the General Assembly of the United Presbyterian Church of North America

References

Further reading
 William L. Fisk, "The Associate Reformed Church in the Old Northwest: A Chapter in the Acculturation of the Immigrant," Journal of Presbyterian History, 1968 46(3): 157-174 
 Hart, D.G. and Noll, M.A. Dictionary of the Presbyterian and Reformed Tradition in America. Downers Grove, IL: InterVarsity, 1999.

External link
 

Religious organizations established in 1858
Religious organizations disestablished in 1958
Presbyterian denominations in the United States
Presbyterian Church (USA) predecessor churches
Former Presbyterian denominations
Scottish-American history
Scotch-Irish American history
1858 establishments in the United States
Associate Reformed Presbyterian Church
1958 disestablishments in the United States